Ernesto Júlio de Nazareth (March 20, 1863 – February 1, 1934) was a Brazilian composer and pianist, especially noted for his creative Maxixe and Choro compositions. Influenced by a diverse set of rhythms like the polka, the habanera, and the lundu, he combined this elements with his classical formation to create compositions that he called “Brazilian tangos". These would be the precursors for what is known today as Choro. His piano repertoire is now part of the teaching programs of both classical and popular styles, as Nazareth once served at the boundary between these two worlds.

Biography
Ernesto Nazareth was born in Rio de Janeiro, one of five children. His mother, Carolina da Cunha gave him his first  piano lessons. At the age of ten, after his mother's death, he continued his piano studies with Eduardo Madeira and Charles Lucien Lambert.
Strongly influenced by Chopin, Nazareth published his first composition Você Bem Sabe (which means "You know it well") in 1877, at age 14. At that time, he had begun his professional career playing in cafes, balls, society parties and in the waiting rooms of movie theaters. In 1893, Casa Vieira Machado published his famous tango Brejeiro.

In 1879, he wrote his first tango, Cruz perigo. In 1880, at the age of 17, he made his first public appearance at the Mozart Club. The following year, he composed the tango Não caio n'outra, his first great success, with several reprints. In 1885, he performed in concerts in different clubs of the court. In 1893, Casa Vieira Machado launched a new catalogue of his compositions, including the tango Brejeiro, which achieved national and even international success, in that the Republican Guard band of Paris began to include it in their repertoire, coming even to record it.

His first concert as a pianist took place in 1898. The following year he prepared the first edition of the tango Turuna. Meanwhile, the "Casa Édison" marching band recorded his tango Brushed, which became quite successful. In 1907 Ernesto Nazareth was appointed third book-keeper of the National Treasury, a position that he did not occupy for not mastering the English language. In 1908, he began working as a pianist at the Mozart Club.

The following year, he participated in a concert held at the National Institute of Music, playing the gavotte Corbeille de fleurs and the tango Batuque. He began to teach private piano lessons and was hired as a pianist for "Casa Gomes" in 1921 and the Odeon Cinema from 1920 until 1924. In São Paulo and Campinas he performed several shows in the Municipal Theater and at the Conservatory. He was given then a grand piano as a gift from his admirers. He was one of the first artists to play for the Society Radio of Rio de Janeiro. In 1932 he presented for the first time, a recital in which he performed only his compositions.

In 1933, after a period of mental instability, due to the deaths of his wife and daughter, diagnosed with syphilis and worsening hearing problems caused by a fall during childhood, Nazareth was hospitalized at the Juliano Moreira Asylum in Jacarepaguá. On February 1, 1934, Nazareth fled the asylum and was found alone three days later in the adjacent forest near a waterfall, dead by drowning.

Catalog of works

Nazareth was noted for creatively combining diverse influences into his music, not only of Brazilian music but also from the music of Europe, Africa and ragtime. Many of his compositions remain part of the repertory today. He composed 88 tangos, 41 waltzes, 28 polkas and numerous sambas, galops, quadrilles, Schottisches, fox-trots, romances and other types of scores, totaling 211 complete compositions.

1922
A bella Melusina
A flor de meus sonhos
A florista
A fonte do lambari
A fonte do suspiro
Adieu
Adorável
Ai rica prima
Albíngia
Alerta!
Ameno resedá
Andante expressivo
Apanhei-te cavaquinho
Arreliado
Arrojado
Arrufos
As gracinhas de Nhô-nhô
Até que enfim!
Atlântico
Atrevidinha
Atrevido
Bambino
Bambino – você não me dá! – words by 
Batuque
Beija-Flor
Beijinho de moça
Bom-Bom
Brejeira
Brejeiro
Bicyclette-club
Caçadora
Cacique
Capricho
Cardosina
Carioca
Catrapuz
Cavaquinho, por que choras?
Celestial
Chave de ouro
Chile-Brazil
Comigo é na madeira
Confidências
Coração que sente
Corbeille de Fleurs
Correcta
Crê e espera
Crises em penca
Cruz, perigo!!
Cruzeiro
Cubanos
Cuéra
Cutuba
Cuyubinha
De tarde
Delightfulness
Dengoso
Desengonçado
Digo
Dirce
Divina
Dor secreta
Dora
Duvidoso
Elegantíssima
Elegia para piano (left hand)
Elétrica
Elite-club
Encantada
Encantador
Ensimesmado
Eponina
Escorregando
Escovado
Espalhafatoso
Espanholita
Está chumbado
Eulina
Expansiva
Êxtase (voice, piano and violin)
Êxtase (piano)
Exuberante
Faceira
Famoso
Fantástica
Favorito
Feitiço
Ferramenta
Fetiço não mata
Fidalga
Floraux
Fon-fon
Fora dos eixos
Furinga
Garoto
Gaúcho
Gemendo, rindo e pulando
Genial
Gente, o imposto pegou?
Gentil
Gotas de ouro
Gracietta
Guerreiro
Helena
Henriette
Hino a Alaor Prata
Hino a Carneiro Leão
Hino a Pereira Passos
Hino da Escola Ester Pedreira de Mello
Hino da Escola Floriano Peixoto
Hino da Escola Pedro II
Ideal
If I Am Not Mistaken
Improviso (Concert Study)
Insuperável
Ipanema
Iris
Jacaré
Jangadeiro
Janota
Julieta ('quadrilha', popular Brazilian dance)
Julieta (valse)
Julita
Labirinto
Laço Azul
Lamentos
Magnífico
Mágoas
Maly
Mandinga
Marcha Fúnebre
Marcha Heróica aos Dezoito do Forte
Mariazinha sentada na pedra
Marietta
Matuto
Meigo
Menino de ouro
Mercedes
Mesquitinha
Myosótis
Não caio n'outra!
Não me fujas assim
Nazareth
Nenê
Nenê – words by Catulo da Paixão Cearense
No jardim
Noêmia
Noturno
Nove de Julho
Nove de Maio
O Alvorecer
O Futurista
O nome dela (polca)
O Nome dela (valse)
O que há
Os teus olhos cativam
Odeon
Onze de Maio
Orminda
Ouro sobre azul
Pairando
Paraíso
Pássaros em festa
Paulicéa como és formosa!
Perigoso
Pierrot
Pingüim
Pipoca
Pirilampo
Plangente
Plus Ultra
Podia ser pior
Polca para a mão esquerda (left hand)
Polonaise
Por que sofre?
Primorosa
Proeminente
Quebra-Cabeças
Quebradinha
Ramirinho
Ranzinza
Rayon d'Or
Reboliço
Recordações do passado
Remando
Resignação
Respingando
Ressaca
Retumbante
Rosa Maria
Sagaz
Salve, Salve, Nações Unidas
Sarambeque
Saudade
Saudade dos Pagos
Saudades e Saudades!
Segredo
Segredos da infância
Sentimentos d'Alma
Soberano
Suculento
Sustenta a ...nota...
Sutil
Tango Habenera
Talismã
Tenebroso
Thierry
Topázio líquido
Travesso
Tudo Sobe...
Tupinambá
Turbilhão de beijos
Turuna
Vem cá, Branquinha
Vésper
Victória
Vitorioso
Você bem sabe
Xangô
Yolanda
Zênite (authored by Maestro Gaó)
Zica
Zizinha

Media

'Escovado' is a common slang which means 'smart'. Ary Vasconcelos tells us in his book Panorama da Musica Popular Brasileira that Nazareth was a "devoted family man who often gave the songs he composed titles in honor of his son, sometimes his wife, or another relative". Travesso was dedicated to his son Ernesto, Marieta and Eulina to his two daughters, Dora to his wife Theodora, Brejeiro to his nephew Gilbert, etc.

Escovado was first published by Casa Vieira Machado & Co. and dedicated to Fernando Nazareth, the composer's younger brother. It became one of Nazareth's greatest success, having the main theme been later tapped by the French composer Darius Milhaud in his Le bœuf sur le toit (1919). In September 1930, accepting an invitation made by Eduardo Souto, then artistic director of Odeon-Parlophone, Nazareth recorded this piece.

Brejeiro is one of the ambient songs in the game Civilization VI, when playing with Brazil. The version used in the game was composed and directed by Geoff Knorr.

References

Attribution
This article is based on the translation of the corresponding article of the Portuguese Wikipedia. A list of contributors can be found there at the History section.

External links
Ernesto Nazareth 150 Anos, website containing original sheet music and arrangements, complete discography with more than 2000 recordings, hundreds of photos, timeline, documents, texts and blog 

Free scores by Ernesto Nazareth at Musica Brasilis website
Free complete scores in PDF format at the official catalog
Free recordings in MP3 format by various pianists at PianoSociety.com
Beatriz Kauffmann's Web Site – Músicas de Ernesto Nazareth em arquivos MIDI 
Rare Music of Ernesto Nazareth (music, text, images) 

1863 births
1934 deaths
Brazilian classical composers
Brazilian classical pianists
Deaths by drowning
Male classical composers
Male classical pianists
Musicians from Rio de Janeiro (city)